Lucas Henrique Ferreira Venuto (born 14 January 1995) is a Brazilian professional association footballer who plays as a forward for Portuguesa.

Club career

Early career
Born in Governador Valadares, Minas Gerais, Venuto joined Cruzeiro's youth setup in 2007, aged 12. Released at the age of 16, he subsequently joined Red Bull Brasil.

Venuto made his senior debut on 29 February 2012, coming on as a second-half substitute for Aleílson in a 1–0 Campeonato Paulista Série A2 home loss against América-SP. Despite being his only appearance of the campaign, he was promoted to the senior squad in November.

Red Bull Salzburg / Grödig
In January 2014, Venuto moved abroad and joined RB Leipzig's under-19 side. In July, however, he joined FC Red Bull Salzburg and was assigned to the reserve team, FC Liefering. He made his debut abroad on 18 July, starting in a 3–0 away defeat of TSV Hartberg for the Austrian Football Second League championship.

Venuto scored his first senior goal on 29 August 2014, netting his team's third in a 4–1 home routing of SV Horn. The following 31 January, after scoring five goals, he was loaned to Austrian Football Bundesliga side SV Grödig for the remainder of the campaign. In June, he signed a permanent contract with the latter side.

Austria Wien
On 8 January 2016, after scoring seven goals during the campaign, Venuto signed a contract with FK Austria Wien until 2019. He made his debut for the new club on 6 February, starting in a 1–0 away success over former side Grödig.

Venuto scored his first goal for Austria Wien on 23 April 2016, scoring the seventh in a 9–0 away routing of SV Mattersburg. On 31 July, he scored a brace in a 3–1 home win against the same opponent.

Vancouver Whitecaps
On 25 January 2019, Venuto was transferred to Major League Soccer side Vancouver Whitecaps FC, agreeing to a three-year contract. He made his debut in the MLS on 2 March, playing the last 21 minutes in a 3–2 home loss against Minnesota United FC.

Venuto scored his first goal for the Caps on 4 May 2019, netting his team's second in a 3–2 away win against Colorado Rapids. On 1 August, Venuto terminated his contract with the club, after three league goals in 22 appearances.

Santos

2019 season
On 6 August 2019, Venuto returned to his home country after agreeing to a three-and-a-half-year contract with Santos. He made his debut for the club on 8 September, replacing Jean Mota in a 1–1 home draw against Athletico Paranaense.

Sport Recife (loan)
On 6 August 2020, after being rarely used, Venuto was loaned to fellow top tier side Sport Recife until the end of the season.

2021 season
Upon returning in February 2021, Venuto was again rarely used, only featuring twice with manager Ariel Holan and once with manager Fernando Diniz. On 10 January 2022, he agreed to leave the club after terminating his contract.

Guarani and Portuguesa
On 19 January 2022, Venuto was announced at Guarani. Roughly one year later, he joined Portuguesa.

Career statistics

References

External links

 
 

1995 births
Living people
People from Governador Valadares
Brazilian footballers
Association football forwards
Campeonato Brasileiro Série A players
Red Bull Brasil players
Santos FC players
Sport Club do Recife players
Guarani FC players
Associação Portuguesa de Desportos players
Austrian Football Bundesliga players
2. Liga (Austria) players
FC Liefering players
SV Grödig players
FK Austria Wien players
Major League Soccer players
Vancouver Whitecaps FC players
Brazilian expatriate footballers
Brazilian expatriate sportspeople in Austria
Brazilian expatriate sportspeople in the United States
Expatriate footballers in Austria
Expatriate soccer players in the United States
Sportspeople from Minas Gerais